St. Paul Armenian Apostolic Church is a parish of the Armenian Apostolic Church in Syracuse, New York USA established in 1908.

In 1956 the church bought its current building on North Geddes Street from the Park Avenue Methodist Church. The structure was listed on the U.S. National Register of Historic Places on June 9, 2010.

References

External links
 St. Paul Armenian Apostolic Church - Syracuse official site

Churches on the National Register of Historic Places in New York (state)
Churches in Syracuse, New York
Armenian-American culture in New York (state)
Armenian Apostolic churches in the United States
Christian organizations established in 1908
National Register of Historic Places in Syracuse, New York
1908 establishments in New York (state)